WDCQ-TV, virtual channel 19 (UHF digital channel 15), branded on-air as Delta College Public Media, is a Public Broadcasting Service (PBS) member television station licensed to Bad Axe, Michigan, United States and serving the Flint/Tri-Cities television market. The station is owned by Delta College in University Center, an unincorporated community in Frankenlust Township in southwestern Bay County. WDCQ-TV's transmitter is located in Quanicassee, in northwestern Tuscola County.

History
The station first signed on the air on October 12, 1964 as WUCM-TV channel 19, licensed to University Center; the "UCM" stood for University Center, Michigan. The station was initially affiliated with National Educational Television (NET) until 1970, when the present-day PBS replaced NET. In 1986, WUCM established a satellite, WUCX-TV channel 35 in Bad Axe, to better cover Michigan's Thumb area. In 1997, when the station first adopted the "Q-TV" branding, both stations changed their calls, with WUCM becoming WDCQ-TV, and WUCX becoming WDCP-TV.

The analog channel 19 transmitter was located on a  tower on the campus of Delta College, near the corner of 4-Mile and Delta Roads in Bay County. The analog channel 35 tower was located just south of Ubly.

The WUCX calls are still used today for Delta College's NPR member station, WUCX-FM 90.1. That station is owned by Central Michigan University, and jointly run by Delta College and CMU.

WDCQ is currently the third most-watched PBS station in Michigan, behind WTVS in Detroit and WGVU-TV in Grand Rapids. As of 2021, Thomas Bennett is the general manager of WDCQ and WUCX-FM.

In late August 2020, Delta College re-branded its public broadcasting operations from "Q-TV" to "Delta College Public Media" to better identify its TV and radio stations as associated with Delta College.

Programming
Programming on WDCQ consists of the general primary PBS fare, with some locally produced shows, such as Currently Speaking, a weekly, live current events discussion program hosted by Andy Rapp, who's been a personality at WDCQ since the early 1970s, when he hosted a daily discussion program, Day by Day, which ran on the old WUCM into the 1980s.

Starting in 2005, WDCQ-TV began to produce local documentaries which looked at aspects of local history in the Great Lakes Bay Region and surrounding areas. These documentaries received many state and national awards including four Michigan Association of Broadcasters "Excellence in Broadcasting" Awards, numerous "Telly" awards among others. Documentaries produced include:

 Ag 2.0: Agriculture - Changes, Challenges & Trends
 BREACHED! The Tittabawassee River Disaster
 Breaking New Ground: Women of the Saginaw Valley
 Coal in the Valley: Mid-Michigan Mining History
 Flint: The 19th Century - The Crossroads of Michigan
 Flint: The 20th Century - The Vehicle City Rises
 The Korean War: Voices from the 38th Parallel
 Margin of Victory - Saginaw Valley's Role in Winning World War II
 More Than a Movie - The US-23 Drive-in Experience
 Restored to Glory - Classic Automobiles, Collectors & Their Stories
 Sailing Into the Past: Travels Aboard El Galeón & The Tall Ship Celebration
 Sawdust & Shanty Boys - Logging the Saginaw Valley White Pine
 Settling In: Immigrants & Cultures That Built Mid-Michigan
 Taking Flight: The History of Aviation in the Great Lakes Bay Region
 Tracks Through Time - Michigan Railroads - History & Impact
 Vanishing Voices of World War Two
 Vietnam Voices: Mid-Michigan Remembers the Vietnam War

Digital television

Digital channels
The station's digital signal is multiplexed:

Analog-to-digital conversion
With the impending end of analog broadcasting in the United States, Delta College decided to use one digital station to cover its entire coverage area. Since it was widely believed that digital signals would travel further than analog signals, Delta College anticipated this would make up for the main WDCQ signal's shortfall on the Thumb. When each analog station was assigned a digital channel, WDCQ University Center was assigned channel 18 while WDCP Bad Axe was assigned channel 15 for digital. For practicality and monetary reasons, school officials opted to activate only channel 15, from a location that was close enough to the Tri-Cities to provide city-grade coverage to the area. Accordingly, on November 28, 2003; the two stations switched callsigns, with channel 19 becoming WDCP, and channel 35 now WDCQ.

WDCQ-TV discontinued regular programming on its analog signal, over UHF channel 35, on June 12, 2009, the official date in which full-power television stations in the United States transitioned from analog to digital broadcasts under federal mandate. The station's digital signal remained on its pre-transition UHF channel 15, using PSIP to display the station's virtual channel as channel 19—reflecting the analog channel position of WDCP. Even though FCC regulations regarding PSIP would usually mandate that WDCQ use "35" as its virtual channel, Delta College sought and received permission to use "19" instead. This is because most of its viewers live in the Flint/Tri-Cities area and had watched the station on channel 19 for almost half a century. However, WDCQ-TV is on channel 35 for DirecTV customers in its market.

References

External links

PBS member stations
Television channels and stations established in 1964
DCQ-TV
1964 establishments in Michigan
Saginaw Intermediate School District